The 1977–78 season was the 32nd season in Rijeka’s history and their 16th season in the Yugoslav First League. Their 5th place finish in the 1976–77 season meant it was their fourth successive season playing in the Yugoslav First League.

Competitions

Yugoslav First League

Classification

Results summary

Results by round

Matches

First League

Source: rsssf.com

Yugoslav Cup

Source: rsssf.com

Squad statistics
Competitive matches only.

See also
1977–78 Yugoslav First League
1977–78 Yugoslav Cup

References

External sources
 1977–78 Yugoslav First League at rsssf.com
 Prvenstvo 1977.-78. at nk-rijeka.hr

HNK Rijeka seasons
Rijeka